Jeff Wexler is an American production sound mixer. He has been nominated for two Academy Awards in the category Best Sound. He has worked on more than 70 films since 1972.  He is the son of cinematographer Haskell Wexler.

Selected filmography

 Coming Home (1978)
 Foul Play (1978)
 Being There (1979)
 9 to 5 (1980)
 An Officer and a Gentleman (1982)
 The Natural (1984)
 Get Shorty (1995)
 Independence Day (1996)
 Jerry Maguire (1996)
 As Good as It Gets (1997)
 Fight Club (1999)
 Almost Famous (2000)
 61* (2001)
 The Last Samurai (2003)
 The Family Stone (2005)
 Mission: Impossible III (2006)
 42 (2013)

References

External links

Year of birth missing (living people)
Living people
American audio engineers
Best Sound BAFTA Award winners
Place of birth missing (living people)